Toy Talmadge Caldwell Jr. (November 13, 1947 – February 25, 1993) was the lead guitarist and main songwriter of the 1970s Southern Rock group The Marshall Tucker Band.  A founding member of the band, Caldwell remained with the group until 1983.  In addition to his role as lead guitarist, he was also the band's steel guitarist and performed lead vocals including on one of the band's best-known hits, "Can't You See."

Early life
Caldwell was born November 13, 1947, in Spartanburg, South Carolina, to Mr. and Mrs. Toy Talmadge Caldwell Sr. He began playing guitar before his teen years with his younger brother Tommy Caldwell. He developed a unique style of playing, playing the electric guitar using his thumb rather than a pick. Toy played basketball and football in high school with friends George McCorkle, Jerry Eubanks, and Doug Gray. While very involved in sports, the boys eventually became interested in music including jazz and blues. By the age of sixteen, Caldwell was passionate about music, sports, and his other obsession, motorcycles. He also enjoyed hunting and fishing.

Caldwell decided to enlist in the United States Marine Corps. In 1966, he reported for recruit training at Parris Island, South Carolina. After being wounded in Vietnam in September 1968, he was evacuated for two weeks, then returned for duty. Caldwell was discharged in 1969 and once again began playing music with his high school buddies. The Spartanburg chapter of the Marine Corps League is named the Hutchings-Caldwells Detachment in honor of Toy, his brother Tommy and another Marine, Pvt Nolan Ryan Hutchings, who was killed during the Iraq Invasion in 2003.

Career

The Marshall Tucker Band
Returning to Spartanburg from his military service Caldwell formed the Toy Factory band with Franklin Wilkie, Doug Gray and Jerry Eubanks. Younger brother Tommy Caldwell joined in 1973 when Wilkie left and the band became the Marshall Tucker Band. Toy Caldwell was the group's lead guitarist and main songwriter.

Later career
He later formed the Toy Caldwell Band and released an eponymous CD in 1992; the record was later renamed Son of the South by Southern country rocker and Caldwell's personal friend, Charlie Daniels. The album was digitally re-released in 2009 through Hopesong Digital / GMV Nashville.

Personal life
Caldwell married his wife Abbie on September 12, 1969. The song "Ab's Song" from The Marshall Tucker Band's debut album was written for her. He was also the father of two girls, Cassady and Geneal Caldwell.

He was the older brother of co-founder and bass guitarist Tommy Caldwell, who was killed at age 30 in an automobile accident on April 28, 1980, and to Tim Caldwell, who on March 28, 1980, one month prior to Tommy's death, was killed at age 25 in a collision with a Spartanburg County garbage truck on S.C. Highway 215.

Death

Toy Caldwell was found dead in bed by his wife, Abbie, on February 25, 1993, at his home in Moore, South Carolina. The cause of death was reported as cardio-respiratory failure due to viral myocarditis, by Spartanburg County Coroner Jim Burnett. Nevertheless, a toxicologist's report found that the cause of death was a cardiac arrest brought on by cocaine use.

External links

References

1947 births
1993 deaths
American Southern Rock musicians
American rock guitarists
Drug-related deaths in South Carolina
Cocaine-related deaths in South Carolina
United States Marine Corps personnel of the Vietnam War
Burials in South Carolina
Lead guitarists
Pedal steel guitarists
Musicians from Spartanburg, South Carolina
20th-century American guitarists
Guitarists from South Carolina
The Marshall Tucker Band members